|}

The Normans Grove Chase was a Grade 2 steeplechase National Hunt race in Ireland. It was run at Fairyhouse Racecourse over a distance of 2 miles and 1 furlong and took place each year in March or April at the course's Easter Festival. The 2017 running was moved to a fixture in early April to avoid clashing with similar races at the Punchestown Festival. Prior to 2013 the race took place in January.

The race was first run in 1997.  It was awarded Grade 3 status in 2004 and then raised to Grade 2 status the following year.

The race was run for the last time in 2017.  In 2018, Fairyhouse and Navan agreed to swap the distances of their two Graded Chases scheduled for the spring, leading to the creation of the Devenish Chase and the discontinuation of this race.

Records
<div style="font-size:90%">
Most successful horse (2 wins):
 Klairon Davis – 1998,1999,2001

Leading jockey  (5 wins):
 Ruby Walsh – Nickname (2007,2008), Blazing Tempo (2012), Twinlight (2015), Ballycasey (2017)

Leading trainer (7 wins):
 Willie Mullins -  Florida Pearl (2004), Scotsirish (2010), Golden Silver (2011), Blazing Tempo (2012), Arvika Ligeonniere (2014), Twinlight (2015), Ballycasey (2017)

</div>

Winners
 Amateur jockeys indicated by "Mr".''

 The 2008 race took place at Gowran Park.

See also
 List of Irish National Hunt races

References

Racing Post:

National Hunt races in Ireland
National Hunt chases
Fairyhouse Racecourse
Recurring sporting events established in 1997
Recurring sporting events disestablished in 2017
1997 establishments in Ireland
2017 disestablishments in Ireland